France is divided into 577 constituencies (circonscriptions) for the election of deputies to the lower legislative House, the National Assembly (539 in Metropolitan France, 27 in the overseas departments and territories, and 11 for French residents overseas). Deputies are elected in a two-round system to a term fixed to a maximum of five years. The department of Nord has 21 Members of Parliament.

List

References

See also 

Legislative_constituencies_of_the_Nord_department
Nord